Cypriot-Finnish relations are foreign relations between Cyprus and Finland. Finland recognized Cyprus on August 16, 1960. Both countries established diplomatic relations on September 2, 1961. Cyprus has an embassy in Helsinki and an honorary consulate in Vantaa. Finland has an embassy and 2 honorary consulates in Nicosia. The two countries share membership of the European Union, Council of Europe and Organization for Security and Co-operation in Europe.

See also 
 Foreign relations of Cyprus
 Foreign relations of Finland
 Neutral and Non-Aligned European States

External links 
  Cyprus Foreign Affairs: List of bilateral treaties with Finland
  Cyprus embassy in Helsinki
  Finnish embassy in Nicosia

 

 
Finland 
Bilateral relations of Finland